Cartagena is a district of the Santa Cruz canton, in the Guanacaste province of Costa Rica.

History 
Cartagena was created on 2 October 1964 by Acuerdo Ejecutivo 405. Segregated from Tempate.

Geography 
Cartagena has an area of  km² and an elevation of  metres.

Villages
Administrative center of the district is the village of Cartagena.

Other villages in the district are Corocitos and Lorena.

Demographics 

For the 2011 census, Cartagena had a population of  inhabitants.

Transportation

Road transportation 
The district is covered by the following road routes:
 National Route 155
 National Route 910

References 

Districts of Guanacaste Province
Populated places in Guanacaste Province